This timeline of Rwandan history is a chronological list of major events related to the human inhabitants of Rwanda.

17th century

18th century

20th century

21st century

See also
 Timeline of Kigali
 Chronology of the Rwandan Genocide
 List of years in Rwanda

References

Bibliography
  
 
 
 
 
 

History of Rwanda
Rwanda
 
Years in Rwanda